HMS Leda was a 46-gun  fifth-rate frigate built for the Royal Navy during the 1820s, one of seven ships of the Druid sub-class.

Description
The Druid sub-class was an enlarged and improved version of the Serinapatam design, modified with a circular stern. The ship's tonnage was 1171  tons burthen. The Druid sub-class was armed with twenty-eight 18-pounder cannon on her gundeck, fourteen 32-pounder carronades on her quarterdeck and a pair of 9-pounder cannon and two more 32-pounder carronades in the forecastle. The ships had a crew of 315 officers and ratings.

Construction and career
Leda, the fourth ship of her name to serve in the Royal Navy, was ordered on 15 May 1821, laid down in October 1824 at Pembroke Dockyard, Wales, and launched on 15 April 1828. She was completed for ordinary at Plymouth Dockyard in May 1828 and the ship was roofed over from the mainmast forward.

Notes

References

Seringapatam-class frigate
1828 ships
Ships built in Pembroke Dock